Sebastian Sebastiani, (died 1626) was an Italian sculptor and founder. His exact date of birth is unknown.

Born in Camerino, Sebastiani trained in the workshop of Girolamo Lombardo in Recanati, and collaborated with several smelters. The workshop often huddled pacts to cope with the commission volumes, so that often the works of these sculptors are teamwork and can hardly be attributed to only one of them. He oversaw the process of bronze casting for the monument to Pope Paul V. He contributed to the main door right side of the Basilica della Santa Casa along with Tiburzio Vergelli. He died in 1626 in Recanati.

References
 Vitalini Giuseppe Sacconi, Macerata and its territory: the Sculpture
 Floriano Grimaldi, Sebastian Sebastiani, in Id, The Art of Sculpture and the Getto. Recanatese The School of Sculpture, Recanati, Tecnostampa Editions, [2011], vol. 1, p. 255-267.
 Sebastian Sebastiani on 'Encyclopedia Treccani'

External links 
 

Year of birth unknown
1626 deaths
17th-century Italian sculptors
Italian male sculptors